Saint-Augustin may refer to:

Algeria
Saint Augustin Basilica, Annaba

Canada

New Brunswick
Village-Saint Augustin, New Brunswick, a community

Quebec
Saint-Augustin, Quebec (parish), a parish municipality
Saint-Augustin, Quebec (municipality), a municipality and settlement
Saint-Augustin Airport
Saint-Augustin River
Saint-Augustin-de-Desmaures, a city west of Quebec City
Saint-Augustin-de-Woburn, a parish municipality in the Estrie region
Saint-Augustin, a former municipality now part of the city of Mirabel, Quebec

France
 Saint-Augustin, Paris, a Catholic church
 Saint-Augustin (Paris Métro), a station on Line 9
 Saint-Augustin, Charente-Maritime, a commune
 Saint-Augustin, Corrèze, a commune
 Saint-Augustin, Pas-de-Calais, a commune
 Saint-Augustin, Seine-et-Marne, a commune
 Saint-Augustin-des-Bois, a commune in Maine-et-Loire

Madagascar
 Saint Augustin, Madagascar, a town and commune
 Bay of Saint-Augustin, the town's eponymous bay

See also
 Saint Augustine (disambiguation)